Japtyesh Singh Jaspal is an Indian Shooter from Chandigarh who competes in the 25 meter rapid fire pistol and had represented India at the ISSF Junior World Cup 2018(Sydney) and 14th Asian Shooting Championships(Doha). He won the bronze at the ISSF Junior World Cup 2018(Sydney) and 14th Asian Shooting Championships(Doha) in the 25m Rapid Fire Junior Men Team Event.

References

External links
 Profile at ISSF

Living people
1999 births
Indian male sport shooters
Sport shooters from Punjab, India
Place of birth missing (living people)
21st-century Indian people